"Better" is the debut single by Brooke Fraser from her multi-platinum and award-winning album What to Do with Daylight.

Song information
This was the song that introduced and launched Fraser as a recording artist in New Zealand. She wrote the song when she was in seventh form in high school. The song was also used in the New Zealand advertisements for World Vision, with Brooke appearing in them as well.

Chart performance
"Better" debuted on the New Zealand Singles Chart at number fifty on July 6, 2003 and peaked at number three where it stayed for four weeks. The song spent a total of twenty two weeks on the chart. Furthermore, the single was the tenth biggest song in the year-end Top 50 Singles of 2003.

Track listing
"Better (6/8 Version)" (4:02)
"Better (4/4 Version)" (3:54)
"Pliable (Live Acoustic Mix)" (3:28)

Charts

Weekly charts

Year-end charts

Music video

In the video, Temuera Morrison played Brooke's father.  He is basically a drunken and abusive father that can never take care of himself, and Brooke is looking for a way out.

References

External links
 charts.org.nz - Brooke Fraser - Better
 "Better" video on YouTube

2003 debut singles
Brooke Fraser songs
Songs written by Brooke Fraser
2003 songs
Columbia Records singles